The Patriot League is a collegiate athletic conference comprising private institutions of higher education and two United States service academies based in the Northeastern United States. Outside the Ivy League, it is among the most selective groups of higher education institutions in the NCAA, and has a very high student-athlete graduation rate for both the NCAA graduation success rate and the federal graduation rate.

The Patriot League has 10 core members: American University, the United States Military Academy (Army), Boston University, Bucknell University, Colgate University, College of the Holy Cross, Lafayette College, Lehigh University, Loyola University Maryland, and the United States Naval Academy (Navy). All 10 core members participate in the NCAA's Division I for all Patriot League sports that they offer. Since not all schools sponsor every available NCAA sport, most schools are affiliated with other collegiate conferences for sports such as ice hockey and wrestling.

Only half of the conference's core members compete in the Patriot League for football, as part of the NCAA's Football Championship Subdivision (FCS): Bucknell, Colgate, Holy Cross, Lafayette, and Lehigh. Of the five other conference members, American, Boston University, and Loyola Maryland do not sponsor football, while Army and Navy play in the NCAA Division I Football Bowl Subdivision; Army is an independent, while Navy competes as an associate member of the American Athletic Conference.

Four other private institutions are Patriot League members only for specific sports, and are referred to as associate members. Fordham University and Georgetown University are associate members in football, while MIT is an associate member in women's rowing and the University of Richmond is an associate member in women's golf.

About
Patriot League members are schools with very strong academic reputations that adhere strongly to the ideal of the "scholar-athlete", with the emphasis on "scholar". An academic index ensures that athletes are truly representative of and integrated with the rest of the student body. Out-of-league play for Patriot League schools is often with members of the Ivy League, which follow similar philosophies regarding academics and athletics.

Patriot League members have some of the oldest collegiate athletic programs in the country. In particular, "The Rivalry" between Lehigh University and Lafayette College is both the nation's most-played and longest-uninterrupted college football series.

The winner of the Patriot League basketball tournament receives an automatic invitation to the NCAA Division I basketball tournament every March. In recent years, Bucknell (twice) and Lehigh have both won NCAA tournament games. The Patriot League champions in a number of other sports also receive an automatic invitation to their respective NCAA tournaments.

History

The origins of the Patriot League began after the eight Ivy League schools expanded their football schedules to ten games starting in 1980. Needing opponents with a similar competitive level on a regular basis for each team's three nonconference games, the league contacted two university presidents, the Reverend John E. Brooks, S.J., of Holy Cross, and Peter Likins of Lehigh, about forming a new conference that also prohibited athletic scholarships. The result was the Colonial League, a football-only circuit that began competition in 1986. Its six charter members were Holy Cross, Lehigh, Bucknell, Colgate, Lafayette, and Davidson. Davidson dropped out after the 1988 season for reasons related to geography, lack of competitiveness, and a reluctance to relinquish its basketball scholarships in case the conference expanded into other sports.

In 1990, the league changed its name to the Patriot League at the suggestion of Carl F. Ullrich, who would go on to become the conference's first full-time administrator. At the start of the 1990–91 academic year, the league became an all-sport conference, with 22 sports (11 for men and 11 for women), and now had seven full members, including Fordham and the United States Military Academy (Army) as new members. In 1991, the league gained an eighth full member, the United States Naval Academy (Navy).

In 1993, the league hired Constance (Connie) H. Hurlbut as executive director. She was the first woman and youngest person to be the leader of an NCAA Division I conference.

In 1995, Fordham resigned its full membership (leaving the league with seven full members) but continued as an associate member in football. In 1996, Fairfield and Ursinus joined as associate members in field hockey. (Fairfield left after the 2003 fall season and is now an associate member of the Northeast Conference. Ursinus left after the 2001 fall season and is now a full member of the Division III Centennial Conference.) In 1997, Towson joined as an associate member in football. (Towson left after the 2003 fall season to join the Atlantic 10 Conference, whose football conference would be absorbed by the Colonial Athletic Association in 2007.) In 1999, Hobart joined as an associate member in men's lacrosse and Villanova joined as an associate member in women's lacrosse. (Hobart left after the 2004 spring season, to join the ECAC Lacrosse League, while Villanova left after the 2006 spring season.) In 2001, American University joined as the eighth full member and Georgetown University joined as an associate member in football. Two schools announced in summer 2012 that they would join the league for the 2013–14 academic year, with Boston University making its announcement on June 15, and Loyola University Maryland doing so on August 29.

Athletic scholarships
While Patriot League colleges have always offered need-based financial aid, league members have only been allowed to give athletic scholarships in recent years. Basketball scholarships were first allowed beginning with freshmen entering the league in the fall of 1998.

In 2001, when the league admitted American, which gave scholarships in all its sports (AU does not play football), the league began allowing all schools to do so in sports other than football. Lafayette, the last holdout with no athletic scholarships, began granting full rides in basketball and other sports with freshmen entering the school in the fall of 2006.  Most Patriot League schools do not give athletic scholarships in a number of sports, and Bucknell only granted them in basketball prior to the addition of football scholarships in 2013.

In the spring of 2009, Fordham University announced that it would start offering football scholarships in the fall of 2010. This action made Fordham ineligible for the league championship in that sport, but it also prompted a league-wide discussion on football scholarships. On February 13, 2012, the Patriot League announced its members could begin offering football scholarships starting with the 2013–14 academic year. Since then, each school has been allowed no more than the equivalent of 15 scholarships to incoming football players. Presidents from six of the seven football schools indicated they would award scholarships in the fall of 2012. Georgetown University did not commit to offering scholarships. Since the transition to scholarship football was completed for the 2016–17 academic year, each football member has been allowed up to 60 scholarship equivalents per season, a total only slightly lower than the NCAA limit of 63 scholarship equivalents for FCS programs.

Executive directors

Member schools

Full members
There are ten "full" member schools:

Associate members
There are four associate-member schools:

Notes

 American, Boston, and Loyola do not play football. Army participates as an independent in the NCAA Football Bowl Subdivision (formerly Division I-A) and Navy participates in the FBS American Athletic Conference for football only. Fordham and Georgetown replace them in the Patriot League for football only.

Former full members

Former associate members

Membership timeline

Sports
The Patriot League sponsors championship competition in 12 men's and 13 women's NCAA-sanctioned sports. Georgetown and Fordham are Associate members for football, and Georgetown and MIT are Associate members for rowing.

Men's sponsored sports by school

Men's varsity sports not sponsored by the Patriot League which are played by Patriot League schools

Women's sponsored sports by school

Women's varsity sports not sponsored by the Patriot League which are played by Patriot League schools

President's Cup

The Patriot League Presidents' Cup is awarded to the member institution with the highest cumulative sports point total for their Patriot League standings in sponsored men's and women's sports. Points are awarded based upon a combination of an institution's regular-season and tournament finishes in each sport.

President's Cup Winners (combined men and women):

 1991 – Bucknell
 1992 – Bucknell
 1993 – Bucknell
 1994 – Army
 1995 – Army
 1996 – Bucknell
 1997 – Army
 1998 – Bucknell
 1999 – Bucknell
 2000 – Bucknell
 2001 – Bucknell
 2002 – Bucknell
 2003 – Bucknell
 2004 – Bucknell
 2005 – Army
 2006 – Bucknell
 2007 – Bucknell
 2008 – Bucknell
 2009 – Bucknell
 2010 – Bucknell
 2011 – Bucknell
 2012 – Navy
 2013 – Bucknell
 2014 – Navy
 2015 – Navy
 2016 – Navy
 2017 – Navy
 2018 – Navy
 2019 – Navy
 2020 - (COVID-19 pandemic)
 2021 - Navy
 2022 - Navy

Baseball
Tournament champion and MVP
See: Patriot League baseball tournament

Basketball
Men's tournament champion, runner-up, and MVP
See: Patriot League men's basketball tournament

Women's tournament champion
See: Patriot League women's basketball tournament

NCAA

In NCAA basketball, Boston, Bucknell, Navy, Lehigh, and Holy Cross are the only teams in the conference ever to have recorded NCAA Tournament victories. Bucknell won tournament games in 2005 over Kansas and in 2006 over Arkansas. Lehigh won over Duke in the first round in the 2012 tournament.

The Bison, Mountain Hawks, and Crusaders are the only teams to win in the NCAA tournament while actually representing the Patriot League. A Navy team—then representing the Colonial Athletic Association—led by future Hall of Famer David Robinson won three tournament games while advancing to the regional finals in 1986, while BU won two games in the 1959 tournament before falling in the regional finals.  Holy Cross was among the best teams in the country in the late 1940s and early 1950s, and won the 1947 national championship with a team that included future Hall of Famer Bob Cousy. Its combined record in the NCAA tournament is 8–12. After a 63-year drought, Holy Cross defeated Southern University in the 2016 NCAA Tournament. Bryan Cohen of Bucknell was named Patriot League Defensive Player of Year in 2010, 2011, and 2012; he was the only player in league history to win the award three times.

Field hockey
Tournament champion

 1994 – Lehigh
 1995 – Lafayette
 1996 – Colgate
 1997 – Holy Cross
 1998 – Holy Cross
 1999 – Lafayette
 2000 – Holy Cross
 2001 – Fairfield
 2002 – Lafayette
 2003 – American
 2004 – American
 2005 – American
 2006 – American
 2007 – American
 2008 – American
 2009 – American
 2010 – American
 2011 – Lafayette
 2012 – Lafayette
 2013 – American
 2014 – Boston
 2015 – Boston
 2016 – American
 2017 – Boston
 2018 – Boston
 2019 – American
 2020–21 - Bucknell
 2021 - American
 2022 - Lehigh

Football
League champions

 1986 – Holy Cross
 1987 – Holy Cross
 1988 – Lafayette
 1989 – Holy Cross
 1990 – Holy Cross
 1991 – Holy Cross
 1992 – Lafayette
 1993 – Lehigh
 1994 – Lafayette
 1995 – Lehigh
 1996 – Bucknell
 1997 – Colgate
 1998 – Lehigh
 1999 – Colgate and Lehigh
 2000 – Lehigh
 2001 – Lehigh
 2002 – Colgate and Fordham
 2003 – Colgate
 2004 – Lafayette and Lehigh
 2005 – Colgate and Lafayette
 2006 – Lafayette and Lehigh
 2007 – Fordham
 2008 – Colgate
 2009 – Holy Cross
 2010 – Lehigh
 2011 – Lehigh
 2012 – Colgate
 2013 – Lafayette
 2014 – Fordham
 2015 – Colgate
 2016 – Lehigh
 2017 – Colgate and Lehigh
 2018 – Colgate
 2019 – Holy Cross
 2020 – Holy Cross
 2021 – Holy Cross
 2022 – Holy Cross

The Patriot League prohibited athletic scholarships for football from its founding (as the Colonial League) until the league presidents voted to approve football scholarships starting with the 2013 recruiting class. Since then, each school has been allowed no more than the equivalent of 15 scholarships to incoming football players in any given season. With the transition to scholarship football having been completed in 2016, each school is now allowed a maximum of 60 scholarship equivalents per season, three short of the NCAA FCS maximum. However, Georgetown does not offer scholarships.

Until 1997, Patriot League teams did not participate in the NCAA Division I Football Championship playoffs. This practice was in step with the Ivy League's policy of not participating in the playoffs, since the Patriot League was founded with the Ivy League's athletics philosophy. Since 1997, the league champion receives an automatic playoff berth. If there are co-champions, a tie-breaker determines the playoff participant, though the other co-champion is eligible to be selected with an at-large invitation.

Colgate was the first team to receive the league's automatic berth, in 1997. The following year, Lehigh won the league's first playoff game. This was also the only year in which a Patriot League team, Colgate, received a playoff invitation without being a league co-champion.

Because the Georgetown Hoyas opted out of the 2020-21 NCAA Division I FCS football season due to the Covid-19 pandemic, the Patriot League split into a north and south division for the first time. This led to the first ever Patriot League Football Championship Game

Lacrosse
Men's league champions

 1991 – Army
 1992 – Army
 1993 – Army
 1994 – Army
 1995 – Army
 1996 – Bucknell
 1997 – Army
 1998 – Army
 1999 – Army and Lehigh
 2000 – Hobart and Lehigh
 2001 – Bucknell
 2002 – Army, Bucknell and Hobart
 2003 – Army and Bucknell
 2004 – Navy
 2005 – Navy
 2006 – Navy
 2007 – Navy
 2008 – Colgate
 2009 – Navy
 2010 – Army
 2011 – Bucknell
 2012 – Lehigh
 2013 – Lehigh
 2014 – Loyola
 2015 – Colgate
 2016 – Loyola
 2017 – Loyola
 2018 – Loyola
 2019 – Army
 2020 - (COVID-19 pandemic)
 2021 - Lehigh
 2022 - Boston

, the Army Black Knights men's lacrosse team has twelve conference championships, the most of any school in the conference. Prior to the 2004 season, no conference tournament was held to determine a single winner.

Women's league champions

 1991 – Lafayette
 1992 – Lafayette
 1993 – Lafayette
 1994 – Lehigh
 1995 – Lafayette
 1996 – Lafayette
 1997 – Lafayette
 1998 – Lafayette
 1999 – Colgate
 2000 – Lafayette
 2001 – Lafayette
 2002 – Lafayette
 2003 – American
 2004 – Colgate
 2005 – Colgate
 2006 – Holy Cross
 2007 – Holy Cross
 2008 – Colgate
 2009 – Colgate
 2010 – Navy
 2011 – Navy
 2012 – Navy
 2013 – Navy
 2014 – Loyola
 2015 – Loyola
 2016 – Loyola
 2017 – Navy
 2018 – Navy
 2019 – Loyola
 2020 - (COVID-19 pandemic)
 2021 - Loyola
 2022 - Loyola

Soccer
Men's tournament champion, runner-up, and MVP
See: Patriot League Men's Soccer Tournament

Women's league champions

 1990 - Colgate
 1991 – Colgate
 1992 – Colgate
 1993 – Army
 1994 – Colgate
 1995 – Colgate
 1996 – Colgate
 1997 – Colgate
 1998 – Colgate
 1999 – Colgate
 2000 – Holy Cross
 2001 – Bucknell
 2002 – American
 2003 – Navy
 2004 – Colgate
 2005 – Bucknell
 2006 – Navy
 2007 – Navy
 2008 – Army
 2009 – Colgate
 2010 – Lehigh
 2011 – Army
 2012 – Colgate
 2013 – Boston
 2014 – Boston
 2015 – Boston
 2016 – Bucknell
 2017 – Bucknell
 2018 – Boston
 2019 – Navy
 2020–21 - Navy
 2021 - Bucknell
 2022 - Bucknell

Facilities

Literature
The Patriot League was profiled in the John Feinstein book The Last Amateurs (2000). The title is derived from the belief that the Patriot League was the last Division I basketball league that plays a conference tournament (the Ivy League, which operates under the same model, albeit with no scholarships, did not hold a conference tournament until the 2016–17 season) and functions as a place for student-athletes rather than a de facto minor professional circuit with players not representative of their student bodies. The book is Feinstein's chronicle of all seven of the league's men's basketball teams at the time during the 1999–2000 season.

See also 
List of American collegiate athletic stadiums and arenas

Notes

References

External links 
 

 
Northeastern United States
Sports in the Eastern United States
Sports organizations established in 1986
1986 establishments in the United States
Articles which contain graphical timelines